The Laurel Central Historic District is a historic district in Laurel, Mississippi, U.S. It includes 369 governmental, commercial, religious and residential buildings designed in the Neoclassical, Shingle, Queen Anne, Bungalow, and American Craftsman architectural styles. It has been listed on the National Register of Historic Places since September 4, 1987.

References

External links

National Register of Historic Places in Jones County, Mississippi
Historic districts on the National Register of Historic Places in Mississippi
Buildings and structures completed in 1881
1881 establishments in Mississippi